Saidou Sandaogo is a Burkinabé professional football player. He has last played for Al-Mina'a SC in the Iraqi Premier League.

Club career
On January 9, 2012, Sandaogo signed for Algerian club MC Oran. On January 28, 2012, he made his debut for the club as a starter in a league game against AS Khroub, scoring a goal in the 73rd minute of the game. He left the team in the end of the 2012-13 season, going to play in the Iraqi league.

References

External links
 

1988 births
Algerian Ligue Professionnelle 1 players
Burkinabé footballers
Expatriate footballers in Algeria
Living people
MC Oran players
Al-Mina'a SC players
Expatriate footballers in Iraq
Burkinabé expatriate sportspeople in Iraq
Sportspeople from Ouagadougou
Burkinabé expatriate footballers
Association football forwards
21st-century Burkinabé people